Down by the River Thames is the second live album by English singer and songwriter Liam Gallagher. It was released on 27 May 2022 by Warner Records, the same day as his third studio album C'mon You Know. It is an audio recording of the livestream of Gallagher's 5 December 2020 concert on a barge travelling down the River Thames. At the time, concerts in arenas and other venues were prohibited due to COVID-19 lockdowns.

Track listing

Personnel

Musicians
 Liam Gallagher – vocals (all tracks)
 Mike Moore – guitar (tracks 1–14, 16)
 Drew McConnell – bass (tracks 1–14, 16), backing vocals (tracks 1–2, 6–7)
 Dan McDougall – drums (all tracks), backing vocals (tracks 2–10, 16)
 Jay Mehler – guitar (tracks 1–14, 16)
 Paul Arthurs – guitar (tracks 5–6, 11–14), acoustic guitar (track 10)
 Christian Madden – keyboards and piano (all tracks)
 Gene Gallagher – drums (track 9)
 Rhianna Kenny-Wybrow, Frida Touray, Jodie Scantlebury – backing vocals (tracks 2–10, 16)

Production
 Tim Summerhayes – recording
 Eduardo Pull – recording assistant
 Tomas Moreno – recording assistant
 Adam Noble – mixing
 Robin Schmidt – mastering

Charts

References

2022 live albums
Liam Gallagher albums
Warner Records live albums